Thomas David Briggs  (born 25 August 1946, Huddersfield, West Riding of Yorkshire) is a British businessman based in Cheshire, England. He served as the Lord Lieutenant of Cheshire until August 2021.

Education
He was educated at the Charterhouse School. He then received a First Class Honours Bachelor of Laws degree from the University of St Andrews. He then received an MBA from the Wharton School of Business at the University of Pennsylvania.

Business career
He has lived in Cheshire since 1979. He was managing director and then Chairman of Dawsons Music until 2018. He and his family have lived at Dukenfield Hall in Mobberley since 1987.

Voluntary service
He has volunteered with the St John Ambulance since 1975. He has been chairman and then President of Warrington Youth Club since 1980.

Deputy Lieutenant of Cheshire
He was appointed as a Deputy Lieutenant of the County of Cheshire on 9 July 2003. This gave him the Post Nominal Letters "DL" for Life.

High Sheriff of Cheshire
He served as the High Sheriff of Cheshire from 2006 to 2007.

Lord Lieutenant of Cheshire
He was appointed as Lord Lieutenant of Cheshire on 7 March 2010.

As Lord Lieutenant He also served as Custos Rotulorum of Cheshire.

Charities
David Briggs is personally involved with the following Charities as Lord Lieutenant.

 ABF The Soldiers' Charity –Cheshire East (President)
 Active Cheshire (Patron)
 Army Cadet Force, Air Training Corps and Sea Cadet Corps
 Bridge Community Farms
 Cheshire Agricultural Society / Cheshire Show (Deputy President)
 Cheshire Business Leaders
 Cheshire Childbirth Appeal (Patron)
 Cheshire Commonwealth Association (Patron)
 Cheshire Community Foundation (President)
 Cheshire Connect (Chairman)
 Cheshire County Cricket Club (Patron)
 Cheshire Young Carers (President)
 Cheshire, Merseyside and Shropshire Blood Bikes (Patron)
 Chester Cathedral (Chairman of Council)
 East Cheshire Hospice (President)
 Friends of Knutsford Heritage Centre (Honorary Member)
 NeuroMuscular Centre, Winsford (Patron)
 Reserve Forces and Cadets Association Northwest (President)
 Royal British Legion (Member) 
 St John Ambulance (Member)
 Stick’n’Step (Patron)
 University of Chester (Member of Council)
 Vision Support (President)
 Warrington Youth Club (President)
 Platform for Life (Patron)
 Youth Federation for Cheshire, Halton and Wirral (President)

Honours

 He was appointed as Honorary Colonel of the Cheshire Army Cadet Force on 5 October 2010.

Scholastic

 Honorary Degrees

References

1946 births
People educated at Charterhouse School
Wharton School of the University of Pennsylvania alumni
Alumni of the University of St Andrews
English businesspeople
High Sheriffs of Cheshire
Lord-Lieutenants of Cheshire
Commanders of the Royal Victorian Order
Members of the Order of the British Empire
Knights of Justice of the Order of St John
Living people